
Laguna Tacuaral is a lake in the Beni Department, Bolivia. At an elevation of 170 m, its surface area is 16.7 km2.

Lakes of Beni Department